Sugarhill Gang is the self-titled debut album by influential rap group the Sugarhill Gang. It is considered to be the first hip hop studio album, leading to more studio albums by other rappers.

Reception

The album was released in 1980 for Sugarhill Records and was produced by Sylvia Robinson. The single "Rapper's Delight" was the first rap single to become a top-40 hit on the Billboard Hot 100, reaching number 36 on the U.S. pop chart and number 4 on the R&B chart. Although "Rapper's Delight" was the only charting single, the album also included the minor hit, "Rapper's Reprise". Aside from the two singles and "Sugarhill Groove", the remainder of the LP consists of several down-tempo soul tracks and a disco instrumental, as Sylvia Robinson did not believe an album consisting entirely of hip hop music would be commercially viable in 1980.

Track listing
"Here I Am" – 5:09 (Craig Derry, Nate Edmonds)
"Rapper's Reprise (Jam-Jam)" (featuring The Sequence) – 7:40 (Sylvia Robinson)
"Bad News (Don't Bother Me)" – 6:45 (Guy O'Brien, Henry Jackson, Michael Wright)
"Sugarhill Groove" – 9:52 (Guy O'Brien, Henry Jackson, Michael Wright, Sylvia Robinson)
"Passion Play" – 5:10 (Brenda Reynolds, Nate Edmonds, Ray Smith) 
"Rapper's Delight" – 14:37 [4:55 – shortened single version] (Bernard Edwards,  Nile Rodgers)

Personnel
Rappers – Big Bank Hank, Master Gee, Wonder Mike (The Sugarhill Gang)
Backing vocals, and rhythm arrangements  – Positive Force (tracks 3, 5, 6)
Bass – Bernard Rowland (tracks 3, 5, 6),  Douglas Wimbish, possibly Chip Shearin (track 6)
Drums – Bryan Horton (tracks 3, 5, 6), Keith LeBlanc
Guitar – Albert Pittman (tracks 3, 5, 6), Skip McDonald, possibly Brian Morgan (track 6)
Keyboards – Nate Edmonds, Skitch Smith
Percussion – Craig Derry, Harry Reyes, John Stump
Vibraphone, backing vocals – Sylvia Robinson
Special guest appearance – Tito Puente
Special effects – Billy Jones, Nate Edmonds
Producer, engineer, mixing – Billy Jones, Nate Edmonds, Sylvia Robinson

Charts

References

External links
 The Sugarhill Gang – Sugarhill Gang at Discogs

1980 debut albums
Disco albums by American artists
Soul albums by American artists
The Sugarhill Gang albums
Sugar Hill Records (hip hop label) albums